Jason Brett Levine, also known as Jay Levine, is a Canadian musician, songwriter and music producer. Jason is the brother of musician/producer Jon Levine.

Career
In the 1990s, Levine was the bassist for the Juno Award-winning Canadian band The Philosopher Kings. In 1998, Levine and Philosopher Kings guitarist James Bryan McCollum created Prozzäk. Levine serves as Prozzäk's bassist and lead vocalist. Levine has written and produced songs for several performers during his career, including b4-4, Kaci Battaglia, Fefe Dobson, Susan Cagle, Honor Society, Natalie Bassingthwaighte, Miranda Cosgrove and Charlotte Sometimes.

Award nominations
In 2001, Levine and  McCollum were nominated for the Juno Award for Best Producer for their production of the b4-4 single "Get Down" and the Prozzäk single "www.nevergetoveryou".

References

External links
Jay Levine's Official Website

Living people
Canadian bass guitarists
Canadian male singers
Canadian record producers
Year of birth missing (living people)
Place of birth missing (living people)